John Alfred Pepys (16 April 1838 – 22 March 1924) was an English first-class cricketer active 1857–1869 who played for Kent County Cricket Club and MCC. He was born in Marylebone and died in Bexhill-on-Sea.

Pepys was educated at Eton College and Christ Church, Oxford, where he matriculated in 1856 and graduated B.A. in 1861. He became a Church of England priest and was curate of Easington, Yorkshire.

References

1838 births
1924 deaths
English cricketers
Kent cricketers
Marylebone Cricket Club cricketers
Oxford University cricketers
North v South cricketers
Gentlemen of England cricketers
Gentlemen of Kent cricketers
People educated at Eton College
Alumni of Christ Church, Oxford
19th-century English Anglican priests
Gentlemen of Marylebone Cricket Club cricketers